Following are the results of the 2005 Copa Aerosur, the Bolivian football tournament held in La Paz, Cochabamba and Santa Cruz, sponsored by AeroSur airline.

Qualifying round

|}

Second stage

Bracket

Semi-final

|}

Final

First leg

Second leg

 Away goal rules.

2005 domestic association football cups
2005
2005 in Bolivian football